Best of British is the third solo album by British keyboardist Ian McLagan. It was his first in nearly twenty years. Recorded in his adopted hometown of Austin, Texas, with his "Bump Band," then consisting of vocalist and keyboardist McLagan, drummer Don Harvey, bassist Sarah Brown, and guitarists Gurf Morlix and "Scrappy" Jud Newcomb, it featured twelve songs by McLagan, two previously released on his 1985 extended play, Last Chance to Dance.

The album was financed by his former bandmate, Ron Wood, who is featured on three tracks, including "She Stole It!" (the cautionary tale of a man, his woman and his record collection) and the ode to their departed Face Ronnie Lane, "Hello Old Friend." The album in dedicated to Lane.

Critical reception
The Austin Chronicle called Best of British "an album of infectious yet personal tunes, permeated with the deep reflection of a man who's lived long enough to see a lot of life and death." AllMusic wrote that "Best of British is an enjoyable album that sounds like what it is -- a busman's holiday by a talented sideman."

Track listing
All tracks composed by Ian McLagan; except where indicated

 "Best of British" (3:47)
 "I Only Wanna Be With You" (3:36)
 "She Stole It!" (3:46)
 "Warm Rain" (4:32)
 "Hope Street" (McLagan, Jorge Calderón) (3:29)
 "Hello Old Friend" (3:10)
 "Big Love" (4:48)
 "Don't Let Him Out of Your Sight" (5:25)
 "Suzie Gotta Sweet Face" (3:35)
 "Barking Dogs" (McLagan, Calderón) (3:56)
 "I Will Follow" (3:51)
 "This Time" (McLagan, Calderón) (3:33)
 "Last Chance to Dance" (3:37) - bonus track on Dreamsville edition

Personnel
 Ian McLagan - vocals, Hammond organ, piano, rhythm guitar
 Don Harvey - drums, percussion
 Sarah Brown - bass, backing vocals
 "Scrappy" Jud Newcomb - acoustic and electric guitar
 Gurf Morlix - electric guitar, backing vocals
with
 Ron Wood - acoustic guitar, slide guitar, vocals (3, 6, 12)
 Deborah Kelly - vocals (4, 7, 8, 12)
 Amy Boone - vocals (4, 8, 12)
 Billy Bragg - vocals (1)
 Akwana Nflembele & The Jumbahkum Singers - vocals (7)
Technical
Stuart Sullivan - engineer
Ron Wood - executive producer

References

2000 albums
Ian McLagan albums